Karacharovo is a rural locality (a selo) in Kurilovskoye Rural Settlement, Sobinsky District, Vladimir Oblast, Russia. The population was 31 as of 2010.

Geography 
Karacharovo is located 16 km north of Sobinka (the district's administrative centre) by road. Bakino is the nearest rural locality.

References 

Rural localities in Sobinsky District